The Munch'ŏnhang Line, or Munch'ŏn Port Line, also known as the Koam Line, is a non-electrified railway line of the Korean State Railway in Kangwŏn Province, North Korea, connecting Ongp'yŏng on the Kangwŏn Line with Tapchon.

History
The line was originally opened by the Chosen Anthracite Company (Japanese: 朝鮮無煙炭株式会社, Chōsen Muentan Kabushiki Kaisha, Korean: 조선 무연탄 주식회사, Chosŏn Muyŏnt'an Chusikhoesa) on 17 December 1943 as a privately owned railway from Munch'ŏn Station on the Hamgyŏng Line (now called Ok'pyŏng Station) to Wŏnsanbukhang Station (now called Koam Station). Later, the line was extended some time after the Korean War from Koam to Sinhŭng-ri.

An extension from Sinhŭng-ri to a newly developed fishing community at T'apchol-li on the Sŏngjŏn Peninsula, via a causeway and the  Sŏkchon Bay Bridge (석전만다리), was opened on 25 May 2018; the opening ceremony included an inspection of the line by Kim Jong-un.

Services

This line serves the May 27 Fishery Station at Koam, the October 3 Factory at Sinhŭng-ri, and the fishing community at Tapch'ŏl-li.

Route 

A yellow background in the "Distance" box indicates that section of the line is not electrified.

External Media
Video report on the opening ceremony and inaugural train across the Sŏkchon Bay Bridge (in Korean)

References

Railway lines in North Korea
Standard gauge railways in North Korea